A , also known as a  or , is a type of entertainer who is 15 years of age and under, manufactured and marketed for image, attractiveness, and personality. It is a sub-category of the idol culture in Japanese pop entertainment. Junior idols are primarily gravure idols who are marketed through photo books and image DVDs, but some are also trained in singing and acting. Unlike other child models, idols are commercialized through merchandise and endorsements by talent agencies, while maintaining an emotional connection with a passionate consumer fan base.

Junior idols have been seen as controversial due to their age, marketing demographic, and involvement in gravure modeling. In Japan, junior idols stand on legally ambiguous ground. Since the revision of Japanese child pornography laws in 2004 and 2014, many distributors of junior idol content have closed or were removed from markets.

Definition

Junior idols consist of entertainers 15 years or under, marketed to have a parasocial relationship with fans who support them by buying merchandise. Junior idols are often marketed through solo DVDs or photo books. The majority of junior idols belong to specialized talent agencies, some of which offer acting and voice training and are geared towards the production of television commercials, photobooks, and related materials. Though sources indicate revenue is relatively low for photographic models, a number of idols (and their parents) see this activity as a gateway to more mainstream media roles.

History 
The trend of junior idols dates back to the mid-1990s, a period marked by significant increase in the number of child models and works involving individuals in that age range. The term chidol, a neologism of the words "child" and "idol", was coined by columnist Akio Nakamori to describe this new phenomena. Eventually, this term fell out of use and was replaced by "Junior Idol". Compared to chidol, the term "junior idol" plays down the association with age and lends some credibility to the industry associating it with the legitimate mainstream idol culture in Japan.

Distribution
Content is available in many formats, usually physical goods such as bond photobooks, CDs and DVDs, but also digital content in the form of Portable Document Format books, JPEG photo sets, high resolution movie clips, etc. To promote a particular idol, or to celebrate the release of a specific title, certain stores hold special events where fans get to meet the idols, shake hands with them, obtain autographs or take photographs, either polaroids or pictures taken with the customers' own cameras, in accordance with the amount of money spent on related goods (either regular DVDs, photobooks, etc., or multiple copies of the same title).

Concerning the contents of the titles put on sale, these include, in general terms, pictures or footage of the idols trying out a variety of outfits, such as school uniforms, bathing suits, gym clothes, yukata or even maid, police and anime-inspired costumes.

Some services providers, such as —a subscription-based website—also feature short radio and movie dramas, available for download and later purchase on DVD.

Controversy
The junior idol industry is a highly contentious one in Japan. Many Japanese, including some politicians, criticise such depictions of underage girls. Despite such disapproval, stores selling junior idol-related materials proliferate in prominent areas, such as Oimoya, a store located in Japan's well-known Akihabara shopping district.

Internationally, the junior idol trend has been harshly criticised. In 2008, the United Nations Children's Fund launched a Say 'NO' to Child Pornography campaign in Japan. As part of the campaign, four major internet portal site providers in Japan removed junior idol-related content from their services. The campaign also garnered over 100,000 signatures in a petition to the Japanese government to amend its child pornography laws to criminalize possession of child pornography, including junior idol materials.

Legal status
Junior idol materials stand on legally ambiguous ground in Japan. Regulation of such materials comes under the Japanese anti-child prostitution and pornography law.

The Japanese Anti-child prostitution and pornography law was enacted in November 1999—and revised in 2004 to criminalize distribution of child pornography over the Internet—defines child pornography as the depiction "in a way that can be recognized visually, such a pose of a child relating to sexual intercourse or an act similar to sexual intercourse with or by the child", of "a pose of a child relating to the act of touching genital organs, etc." or the depiction of "a pose of a child who is naked totally or partially to arouse or stimulate the viewer's sexual desire."

Despite inherent difficulties in effectively enforcing a ban on such materials, on August 25, 2007 the Japanese branch of Amazon.com removed over 600 junior idol titles on grounds the likelihood these were produced in violation of the Japanese anti-child prostitution and pornography law was high. The prolonged filming of the girl's genitalia was in violation of Japanese law. Following the incident, the release date of several photobooks and DVDs originally slated for publication in November 2007 was postponed and idol events cancelled.

See also 
 Gravure idol
 Child modeling
 Child erotica
 Teen idol
 Lolicon
 Kawaii

References 

 01
Celebrity fandom
Child pornography
 
Japanese pornography
Sexuality in Japan
Teen idols